"Let the Dream Come True" is a song by Swiss Eurodance artist DJ BoBo, released in September 1994 as the lead single from his second album, There Is a Party (1994). It achieved success on the charts in Europe, reaching number-one in Finland and Switzerland, number four in Germany and number six in Austria. On the Eurochart Hot 100, the song peaked at number nine in November 1994. Outside Europe, it reached number 22 in Israel, number 28 on the RPM Dance/Urban chart in Canada and number 49 in Australia. The female singer is American singer Lori Glori (aka Lori Hölzel). The single was cetified Gold in Germany.

Critical reception
Pan-European magazine Music & Media commented, "More of the same or...? Well, Let The Dream Come True continues the Euro style of the Swiss DJ's previous hits."

Music video
The accompanying music video for "Let the Dream Come True" was directed by Frank Paul Husmann-Labusga. It was filmed in New York. In the video, we follow a story about an unemployed mother and her little son. In a shop in the city that has a vacancy, the mother goes in while the boy waits outside. But when she comes out again, the boy is gone. He has lost his way in the big city, but is found by a man in a limousine. While the mother walks around the city, desperately looking for her son, the two drives around looking for her. At a park, they get out of the limousine and walks into the park. They stop by at a performance. There the boy sees his mother in the audience and runs into her arms. Radiant with joy, they look at the man smiling at them before the video ends. In between this story, DJ BoBo performs the song with his dancer in and around an empty old factory building. The video was A-listed on Germany's VIVA in November 1994. Husmann-Labusga would also go on directing the videos for "Freedom" and "There Is a Party".

Track listing
 12", Spain (1994)
A1: "Let the Dream Come True" (Club Mix) – 6:09
A2: "Let the Dream Come True" (Radio Mix) – 3:58
B1: "Let the Dream Come True" (Live On Planet Earth Mix) – 6:35
B2: "Let the Dream Come True" (Special Edition) – 3:38

 CD single, France (1994)
"Let the Dream Come True" (Radio Mix) – 3:58
"Let the Dream Come True" (Live On Planet Earth Mix) – 6:3

 CD maxi, Europe (1994)
 "Let the Dream Come True" (Radio Mix)	– 3:58
 "Let the Dream Come True" (Live On Planet Earth Mix) – 6:35
 "Let the Dream Come True" (Club Mix) – 6:09

Charts

Weekly charts

Year-end charts

Certifications

References

1994 singles
1994 songs
DJ BoBo songs
English-language Swiss songs
Music videos directed by Frank Paul Husmann
Number-one singles in Finland
Number-one singles in Switzerland
Songs about dreams
Songs written by Axel Breitung
Songs written by DJ BoBo